Valter Ever (6 November 1902 – 10 July 1981) was an Estonian athlete. He competed in four events at the 1924 Summer Olympics.

References

External links
 

1902 births
1981 deaths
Athletes from Tallinn
People from the Governorate of Estonia
Athletes (track and field) at the 1924 Summer Olympics
Estonian male long jumpers
Estonian male high jumpers
Estonian male pole vaulters
Estonian decathletes
Olympic athletes of Estonia
Estonian military personnel of the Estonian War of Independence
Estonian World War II refugees
Estonian emigrants to Sweden
Olympic decathletes